Century High School is a public high school located in Rochester, Minnesota, United States. It is a member of Independent School District #535 with more than 18,200 students and employs nearly 3,000 community members. More than 80 languages are spoken in ISD 535. Century High School is one of three public high schools in Rochester. The school mascot is the Panther, and school colors are navy blue and silver. The most recent major ranking of Century High School - conducted by U.S. News & World Report - gave Century a "Silver" designation based on U.S. News ranking criteria, and placed it in the Top 1000 schools nationwide.

History
The property was purchased from the Cassidy family in 1996, whose family had owned that property for 105 years.  The school's name was selected after a contentious process that began with a citizen's committee of 80 people who started with 204 names.  After a five-hour meeting they settled on two possible names, Eleanor Roosevelt and Century.  Century referred to the Cassidy farm which had been in the same family for over 100 years.  Eleanor Roosevelt is a former first lady who was in the news in 1996 after remarks by Hillary Clinton.  The two names were forwarded to the School Board for the final decision.  Rochester was still a conservative community with many citizens not interested in selecting a liberal figure.  An informal poll by the local newspaper showed a 2 to 1 preference for Century.  After a forty-minute debate by the School Board, the members voted 4 to 3 for Century, citing a poll by elementary and junior-high students that showed a clear preference for that name.  The students also selected the school's mascot, colors, and fight song.  The construction of the school was supported by a voter-approved bond of $37.3 million.

The school was completed and opened in 1997 as a school for 9th and 10th grade students. 11th and 12th grade students were included in subsequent years. Students ate in the forum until 1998 when construction of the school cafeteria was completed. The cafeteria was later expanded in order to meet the growing student population's needs.

Sports
Century sports teams include adapted floor hockey, alpine skiing, baseball, basketball, cheerleading, cross country running, dance, football, golf, gymnastics, ice hockey, lacrosse, soccer, softball, swimming and diving, tennis, track and field, volleyball, and wrestling. Century also sponsors bowling, rowing, figure skating, and trap shooting.

The Century boys golf team won the state title in 2001. The Century baseball team won the Class AAA state baseball championship in 2003. Century is also known for its National Volleyball Center, which features 11 volleyball courts and a mezzanine.

References

External links
 
 Century Panthers Athletics and Activities

High schools in Rochester, Minnesota
Educational institutions established in 1997
Public high schools in Minnesota
1997 establishments in Minnesota